Tso Ngönis a plateau lake in Xainza County, Tibet Autonomous Region, southwest of China. The lake is part of the Siling Lake drainage system. The shoreline is deeply indented by bays, and the lake is dotted by many islands. It is 28.5 km long and 16.7 km wide and has an area of 269 square km.

References 

Lakes of Tibet
Xainza County